John Waters Presents Movies That Will Corrupt You is a film anthology series produced by the LGBT-interest network here! in 2006. Shot on location in the Baltimore, Maryland home of director John Waters, each film is introduced by him and includes closing comments as well.

Films showcased (in the series' premiere order) 
 Freeway
 L.I.E.
 Fuego
 Baxter
 The Fluffer
 Clean, Shaven
 Beefcake
 Criminal Lovers
 The Hours and Times, Sissy Boy Slap Party, Dottie Gets Spanked
 Pink Narcissus
 Who Killed Pasolini? (Pasolini, un delitto italiano)
 Porn Theatre (The Pussy With Two Heads)
 Irréversible

References

External links
 Official site
 

Here TV original programming
2000s American anthology television series
Lists of LGBT-related films
American motion picture television series
2006 American television series debuts
2006 American television series endings